Mark Wycliffe Elia (born 25 December 1962) is former professional rugby league footballer who represented both New Zealand and Western Samoa.

Background
Elia was born in Auckland, New Zealand.

Playing career
During his long career, Elia played for the Te Atatu Roosters, Northcote Tigers, Kent Invicta, Southend Invicta, St. Helens, Widnes, Halifax, the Canterbury Bulldogs and RC Albi in France.

John Player Special Trophy Final appearances
Mark Elia played left-, i.e. number 4, in St. Helens' 15-14 victory over Leeds in the 1987–88 John Player Special Trophy Final during the 1987–88 season at Central Park, Wigan on Saturday 9 January 1988.

Representative career
Elia represented the New Zealand national rugby league team between 1985 and 1989, playing in ten tests and thirty seven games. He scored five test tries and thirty overall for the Kiwis.

In 1995 Elia represented Western Samoa at the World Cup.

Cricket
During the 1990 season, Elia played cricket in the United States. During this period he umpired a friendly match that took place in America between Australia and Pakistan.

Later years
In 1996 Elia coached the Hawkes Bay Unicorns in the Lion Red Cup.

He later retired to Cootamundra, New South Wales. He will coach the Northcote Tigers in the 2015 Auckland Rugby League competition.

References

External links
Canterbury Bulldogs profile
Saints Heritage Society profile
Saints sign Kiwi star

1962 births
Living people
Auckland rugby league team players
Canterbury-Bankstown Bulldogs players
Expatriate rugby league players in Australia
Expatriate rugby league players in England
Expatriate rugby league players in France
Halifax R.L.F.C. players
Hawke's Bay rugby league team coaches
Hawke's Bay rugby league team players
Kent Invicta players
New Zealand cricket umpires
New Zealand expatriate rugby league players
New Zealand expatriate sportspeople in Australia
New Zealand expatriate sportspeople in France
New Zealand expatriate sportspeople in England
New Zealand national rugby league team players
New Zealand sportspeople of Samoan descent
New Zealand rugby league coaches
New Zealand rugby league players
Northcote Tigers coaches
Northcote Tigers players
Otago rugby league team players
People educated at St Paul's College, Auckland
Racing Club Albi XIII players
Rugby league centres
Rugby league fullbacks
Rugby league wingers
Samoa national rugby league team players
Samoan rugby league players
St Helens R.F.C. players
Te Atatu Roosters players
Widnes Vikings players